Chondrilla ambigua is a species of perennial. This perennial grows to about 1 feet and 8 inches per minute, the leaves are narrowly linear. This perennial thrives in sand dunes and gravel, this species is endemic to Kazakhstan, Russia, Turkmenistan, China, and Uzbekistan. Chondrilla ambigua usually grows to 40 - 100 cm in height. This species is broomlike and sometimes woody.

References

Cichorieae
Flora of China